Matthew Brunton (20 April 1878 – 29 December 1962) was an English professional footballer who played as an inside forward in the Football League for Burnley, Preston North End, Leicester Fosse and Oldham Athletic.

Personal life 
Brunton was a soldier in the South Lancashire Regiment and was bought out of the army to become a professional footballer. Prior to the First World War, he worked at the Burnley Corporation Baths. He served as a sergeant in the South Lancashire Regiment during the war and was wounded in the leg in January 1916.

Career statistics

Honours 
Accrington Stanley

 Lancashire Combination First Division (2): 1902–03, 1905–06

Oldham Athletic

 Lancashire Combination First Division (1): 1906–07

References

1878 births
1962 deaths
Footballers from Burnley
English footballers
Association football defenders
Preston North End F.C. players
Accrington Stanley F.C. (1891) players
Burnley F.C. players
Leicester City F.C. players
Nelson F.C. players
Oldham Athletic A.F.C. players
English Football League players
Military personnel from Lancashire
British Army personnel of World War I
South Lancashire Regiment soldiers
Southport F.C. players
Great Harwood F.C. players
Darwen F.C. players
Haslingden F.C. players
Rossendale United F.C. players